L'udienza is a 1972 Italian-French drama film directed by Marco Ferreri. It was entered into the 22nd Berlin International Film Festival.

Cast
 Enzo Jannacci - Amedeo
 Claudia Cardinale - Aiche
 Ugo Tognazzi - Aureliano Diaz
 Michel Piccoli - Padre Amerin
 Vittorio Gassman - Principe Donati
 Alain Cuny - Padre gesuita
 Daniele Dublino - Il cardinale spagnolo
 Sigelfrido Rossi
 Irena Oberberg - Luisa (as Irene Oberberg)
 Maalerer Bergier - Cardinale tedesco (as Man Lerer Bergier)
 Dante Cleri
 Luigi Scavran
 Giuseppe Ravenna - Segretaria
 Mario Jannilli - Una guardia svizzera
 Enzo Mondino
 Attilio Pelegatti - (as Attilio Pellegatti)
 Bruno Bertocci - Cardinale Osta

External links

1972 films
1970s Italian-language films
1970s French-language films
1972 drama films
Films directed by Marco Ferreri
Films with screenplays by Rafael Azcona
Italian drama films
French drama films
1970s French films
1970s Italian films